Chuban may refer to:

 Chuban people, a Chinese tribe which was a successor to the Yueban
 Chūban, a size of Japanese wood block print